Clinton, New York may refer to:

Clinton County, New York
Clinton, Clinton County, New York
Clinton, Dutchess County, New York
Clinton, Oneida County, New York
Clinton, Manhattan, or Hell's Kitchen, a neighborhood in New York City
East Greenbush, New York, originally Clinton, a town in Rensselaer County, New York

See also
George Clinton (vice president) (1739–1812), first governor of New York, for whom many places in the state are named
DeWitt Clinton (1769–1828), 47th mayor of New York City and seventh governor of New York, for whom many places in the state are named
Hillary Clinton (born 1947), former US senator from New York